Sean Chen may refer to:

 Sean Chen (politician) (born 1949), Taiwanese politician
 Sean Chen (artist) (born 1968), Asian American artist
 Chen Hsin-an (born 1980), Taiwanese basketball player
 Sean Chen (pianist) (born 1988), American pianist

See also
 Shaun Chen (politician) (born 1980) Canadian politician